Foppe Geert de Haan (born 26 June 1943) is a Dutch football coach. He is known for his long association with Frisian club SC Heerenveen. De Haan was the manager of the Tuvalu national football team during 2011 and then rejoined Heerenveen's youth programme. He is also a politician for the Partij van de Arbeid.

Career
De Haan was born in Lippenhuizen, Friesland. He started his managerial career in 1974 with VV Akkrum. After two years he combined this role with the youth team manager's position at SC Heerenveen. By 1978 he had become the manager for Drachtster Boys. He then moved to ACV in 1980, and to Steenwijk in 1983. In 1985 de Haan re-joined Heerenveen, this time as assistant coach. He would go on to spend 20 years with the club, the longest time a coach worked for a Dutch professional football club. De Haan was made head coach in 1992, and in 1993 led  the club back to the Eredivisie. The finished in second place in the Eredivisie with Heerenveen in 2000, thus qualifying for the UEFA Champions League for the first time in the club's history.

In 2003, he received the Sport Award and on 10 May 2004, after his final game as coach of SC Heerenveen, he was invested as a Knight of the Order of Orange-Nassau. He was successively appointed as coach of the Netherlands national under-21 football team, with whom he won the 2006 UEFA European Under-21 Football Championship and 2007 UEFA European Under-21 Football Championship. De Haan was accused by Steven Taylor of calling him a "cheat" as he had been injured in the match and was originally not going to take a penalty in the semi-final penalty shoot-out. Taylor eventually took and scored his penalty in the shootout which the Netherlands won despite this. A semifinal spot in the latter tournament also qualified the Dutch for the 2008 Summer Olympics football tournament, leading his side to the quarter-finals where they were ultimately defeated by Argentina after extra time.

De Haan had announced that he would retire from football at the end of the 2008–09 season, when his contract with the KNVB expired. Instead he returned to work as a senior advisor at SC Heerenveen, before being appointed head coach at South African Premier Soccer League club Ajax Cape Town.

De Haan managed the Tuvalu national football team through their 2011 Pacific Games campaign.   De Haan left his post after the tournament to rejoin Heerenveen's youth programme.

On 20 October 2015, De Haan became interim coach of SC Heerenveen after the team had a disappointing start of the season and Dwight Lodeweges left as head coach. Under De Haan the team went on to win 4 of their first six games, drawing and losing one.

Honours
Netherlands
UEFA European Under-21 Championship: 2006, 2007

References

External links
 

1943 births
Living people
Ajax Cape Town F.C. managers
Dutch expatriate sportspeople in Indonesia
Dutch expatriate sportspeople in South Africa
Dutch expatriate sportspeople in Tuvalu
Dutch football managers
Eredivisie managers
Dutch expatriate football managers
Expatriate football managers in Indonesia
Expatriate football managers in Tuvalu
Expatriate soccer managers in South Africa
People from Opsterland
SC Heerenveen managers
Tuvalu national football team managers
Knights of the Order of Orange-Nassau
Rinus Michels Award winners
Footballers from Friesland
SC Heerenveen non-playing staff
Asser Christelijke Voetbalvereniging managers
Association football midfielders
Dutch footballers